Daqiao Yao Ethnic Township is an ethnic township for Yao people under the administration of Lanshan County in southern Hunan province, China. , it has 7 villages under its administration.

See also 
 List of township-level divisions of Hunan

References 

Townships of Hunan
Lanshan County
Yao ethnic townships